The Ops-Core Future Assault Shell Technology (FAST) Helmet, also known as the FAST helmet, is an American combat helmet used by special operations forces and law enforcement organizations in various countries, as well as the current standard protective headgear of the Norwegian Armed Forces.

The FAST helmet series features a distinctive shell shape, with ear cut geometry which extends coverage over the rear occipital bone without load carrier interference, and optimizes weight distribution for increased stability, integration, balance, and comfort. The helmet features various suspension and retention systems, and ARC rails which, similar to picatinny rails, enable users to mount items like helmet lights and cameras.

Due to its popularity within special forces communities, copies of the helmet has been produced by Russian and Chinese companies for adoption by the two countries' special forces, along with export markets.

History
It was developed by the U.S. Army Research Laboratory in collaboration with the U.S. Army Natick Soldier Research, Development and Engineering Center and the Program Executive Office (PEO) Soldier as part of the Army Manufacturing Technology (ManTech) Program, which also led to the development of the Enhanced Combat Helmet (ECH).

The name FAST helmet was coined by a manufacturing company called Ops-Core in 2005. In 2008, Ops-Core showed off their prototype helmet with their Head-Loc™ Helmet Retention System (a.k.a. Head-Loc Retention System) at the 2008 SHOT SHOW convention. The helmet was publicly revealed in 2009 at the annual SHOT Show. It was issued to U.S. special forces operators deployed in Afghanistan.

In 2019, U.S. Special Operations Command awarded Gentex a contract worth $95 million to supply Ops-Core FAST SF Super High Cut Helmets.

Development
Compared to standard combat helmets, the FAST helmet offers up to 25% weight reduction and is notable for its early use of ultra-high-molecular-weight polyethylene fibers (UHMWPE) in its design. It was also designed to allow outside features such as wearing communications headsets which can be attached with rail adapters.

Design

The FAST helmet ranges in weight from about 667–1592 g (1.47–3.51 lbs). The type of UHMWPE material for the ballistic FAST models provides increased protection against NIJ Level IIIA handgun rounds. It can be fitted with a mounting bracket, patented first in 2014, for accessories like night vision goggles and communications headsets, similar to PASGT and MICH. The Velcro featured on to the helmet also allows for the wearer to attach national flag or the emblem of unit which they belong to, in addition to other IFF (Identification friend or foe) patches such as call sign and blood type .

Users can wear it with different communications headsets with ease and comfort. It has different color options, such as foliage green, black, olive green, ranger green, tan 499, urban grey, MultiCam and desert MARPAT. As well as having mesh and cloth helmet covers in varying camouflage patterns.

The FAST RF1 High Cut Helmet System is a rifle rated ballistic helmet at an average of 3.5 lbs (1592 grams) able to protect against rifle rounds like the 7.62×39mm and 7.62x51mm due to the 0.400" (10.16mm) shell thickness. The different color options are black, tan 499, ranger green, urban gray and MultiCam.

The FAST XR Helmet System represents an intermediate in protection between the SF line of helmets and the RF1 Helmet System, protecting against 7.62x39mm rifle rounds at a distance of 10 feet, but not against larger rounds such as 7.62x51mm. This is due to having a shell thickness of 0.280" (7.112mm). It is far lighter than the RF1, averaging at only about half a pound heavier than the SF helmet, depending on the type of chinstrap. It is available in Tan 499, Ranger Green, MultiCam, Black, and Urban Gray.

In addition to military and law enforcements, the non-ballistic version of the helmet also has gained considerable popularity among civilian occupations, such as outdoor sportsmen, journalists, disaster relief personnel and other field workers due to its modular design.

Foreign Copies 

Due to the helmet's widespread adoption, many countries (mainly China and Russia) have successfully copied and manufactured their own versions of FAST helmets or other similar High-Cut helmets for use by their special forces and police tactical units, and export to friendly countries. While other companies have produced and released cheap imitations for survival games. However, most of these foreign copies were not made under license by the Ops-Core company, and the bulletproof performance is generally inferior to the real helmets. 

One of the notable example of these foreign copies is LShZ 1+ light combat helmet made by Russian company Armocom, which first appeared publicly in 2012. At first glance, the helmet looks superficially similar to the original FAST, but compared to the helmets made by Ops-Core, it has flatter shell and was designed to mount domestically designed Russian night vision and communication devices instead of American-made ones. LShZ 1+ and other Russian copies of FAST helmet are known to be used by various Russian Spetsnaz units and special operations forces of other post-Soviet states.

Users

Current
 : The Islamic Emirate Army make use of stocks left over or acquired from Afghan National Army soldiers and commandos. In use with the Badri 313 Battalion.
 : Used by the Special Operations Battalion.
 : Used by the Algerian special forces.
 : Used by the Special Forces.
 : Used by special forces units since 2010 and the Australian Defence Force since 2015. Also worn by Police Tactical Groups of each state.
 : 20,000 Sentry XP Mid Cut-type helmets ordered in 2016, adopted by the Austrian Armed Forces in 2017.
 : Used by the Special Forces.
 : Russian copies are used by 5th Spetsnaz Brigade and Alpha Group.
 : In use by Special Forces Group.
 : Used by the Special Operations Command of Brazilian Army and GRUMEC of Brazilian Navy.
 : Used by the Royal Brunei Air Force base defense squadrons and Royal Brunei Armed Forces special forces.
 : Worn by the commandos of 68th Special Forces Brigade.
 : In use by the Special Forces Command.
 : Used by the Joint Task Force 2 and various CANSOFCOM units.
 : Used by the Special Forces of the Chilean Army.
 : OEM factories produce cloned helmets for use in multiple countries, FAST-styled helmets are also in use with the People's Liberation Army and People's Armed Police.
 : In use by AFEUR commandos.
 : Used by Cypriot National Guard special forces.
 : In use by 601st Special Forces Group.
 : Used by the Jaeger Corps and other SOKOM units.
 : Mainly used by units of El-Sa'ka special operations forces.
 : In use by the Estonian Special Operations Force (ESTSOF).
 : Worn by Finnish Naval Special Forces Coastal Jaegers and the Guards jaeger Regiments city jaegers.
 : Used by the Special Operations Command's units and specialized conventional units such as the Commando Parachute Group and Mountain Commando Group.
 : Used by the Georgian Special Operations Forces.
 : Used by various Kommando Spezialkräfte (KSK) and Kommando Spezialkräfte Marine (KSM) units. It's also used by the GSG 9 and state SEK units.
 : Used by the Special Forces of the Hellenic Army and Hellenic Navy 
 : High Cut helmets are in use by Special Duties Unit and Special Tactical Squad of Hong Kong Police Force.
 : In use by Hungarian Defence Forces and Counter Terrorism Centre special forces units.
 : Used by various special operations forces of Indian Armed Forces such as Para SF, Garud Commando Force and MARCOS. Also in use by the National Security Guard (NSG) counter-terrorism unit.
 : Used by Kopassus (Komando Pasukan Khusus) of the Indonesian Army, Kopaska (Komando Pasukan Katak) of the Indonesian Navy and Mobile Brigade Corps of the Indonesian National Police. 
 : Used by the Iraqi Special Operations Forces (ISOF).
 : Used by Peshmerga special operation forces.
 : Used by the Army Ranger Wing (ARW) of Irish Defence Forces.
 : Used by Israeli special forces units.
 : Primarily used by 9th Paratroopers Assault Regiment "Col Moschin" and COMSUBIN special forces units.
 : In use by two JSDF special operations units, Special Forces Group and Special Boarding Unit.
 : Used by the Jordanian Special Operation Forces (JORSOF).
 : In use by various Spetsnaz units.
 : Used by the Kenya Special Forces.
 : In use by the Special Tasks Unit.
 : In use by the Lithuanian Special Operations Force.
 : Used by the Special Police Unit (USP) of the Grand Ducal Police.
 : Used by tactical units of Public Security Police Force.
 : In 2016, a contract was signed with Usahawan PSE Sdn Bhd to supply FAST helmets to the Malaysian military under RM45.9 million. The first Malaysian unit issued with the helmet is the 7th Royal Ranger Regiment.
 : It is currently used by various units within the Mexican Army and Naval Infantry Corps.
 : Used by special forces of Moldovan Armed Forces.
 : In use by Korps Commandotroepen (KCT) of the Royal Netherlands Army.
 : Used by New Zealand Special Air Service (NZSAS) and Armed Offenders Squad of the New Zealand Police.
 : Used by the Special Operations Regiment.
 : In 2011, the Norwegian Defense Logistic Organization (NDLO) selected the FAST helmet as the new standard issue protective headgear for the Norwegian Army and National Guard. The decision was made after positive results from rounds of ballistic and safety testing and has been previously fielded by the Norwegian Special Forces in both Afghanistan and Iraq.  This replaces the PASGT made by Cato Ringstad.
 : Used by special forces of Pakistan Armed Forces, including the Special Service Group of Pakistan Army.
 : Used by special forces of Peruvian Armed Forces.
 : Different variations of Ops Core FAST. helmets and clone copies are used by different units in the Armed Forces of the Philippines and Philippine National Police but the most notable users are the Philippine NAVSOCOM as they are the first unit to use them starting late 2015.
 : FAST Ballistic High Cut helmets used by JW GROM and JW Formoza operators. 50 thousand HP-05 ordered for Polish Army.
 : Used by operators of the Special Operations Troops Centre.
 : Used by special forces of the Qatari Armed Forces.
 : Used by Romanian Land Forces special forces units.
 : LShZ 1+ helmets and other Russian copies are currently in use by various Spetsnaz units, such as the SSO and FSB Alpha Group.
 : High Cut helmets are in use by special forces of Royal Saudi Land Forces.
 : FAST helmets used by most Gendarmerie units.
 : Worn by the commandos of Special Operations Task Force.
 : Used by the 5th Special Operations Regiment.
 : Used by special forces of Slovenian Armed Forces.
 : Used by the Danab Brigade commandos.
 : Used by the Special Forces Brigade.
 : Used by ROKASWC, ROKNSWF and 707th Special Mission Group.
 : Used by Fuerza de Guerra Naval Especial (FGNE) special forces unit of Spanish Navy.
 : FAST Maritime Helmets used by Särskilda operationsgruppen.
 : Used by Kommando Spezialkräfte special forces units.
 : Used by MPSSC and special operations units of ROCMC.
 : Used by the Naval Special Warfare Command of Royal Thai Navy.
 : Used by special forces units of Turkish Armed Forces, with a reported incident where a Turkish soldier's life was saved when his Ops-Core Sentry-type helmet was shot at in 2015.
 : Used by Special Operations Forces. Also sees a rapid use with the National Guard of Ukraine upon Russian buildup on border in 2021–2022 Russo-Ukrainian crisis.
 : The UAE Presidential Guard is equipped with the FAST Ballistic High Cut helmet, announced in 2013.
 : Used by the Pathfinder Platoon, Royal Marines and the United Kingdom Special Forces. High Cut helmets are also in use by CTSFO units of Metropolitan Police Service.
 : Used by special operations forces. Delta Force has used the FAST XP helmet (MultiCam shell) since around 2015, though SF (also in MultiCam) is in use as well. Some DEVGRU operators had used the FAST XP (with AOR1 paintjob) until the FAST Maritime (AOR1 shell) started being officially issued in 2011. Navy SEALs use the LBH (same cut as an XP, but with a different velcro shape pattern and the shell material is the same as that of the Maritime) with AOR1 shell and SWCC with AOR2 shell. AFSOC, Special Forces (Green Berets), 75th Ranger Regiment and Marine Raider Regiment use the FAST Maritime  as well as the FAST SF.
 In use with the LAPD SWAT, where a SWAT officer credited the helmet for saving his life from being shot in the head in 2017. Also used by the NYPD ESU.
 Small number of FAST SF helmets purchased by the FBI.  Also seen use by the Hostage Rescue Team
 : Seen in use by special operations forces of both National Bolivarian Armed Forces and Bolivarian Intelligence Service.
  Vietnam: In December 2020, it was reported that Z176 Factory has been producing copies of the High Cut helmets for police and Special Forces use.

Former
 : Used by the Afghan National Army Commando Corps.

Gallery

References

External links

 FUATURED PRODUCTS FAST Helmet
 Ops-Core FAST RF1 High Cut Helmet System

Military technology
Combat helmets of the United States
Military equipment introduced in the 2000s